Yearsley is a surname. Notable people with the surname include:

 Ann Yearsley (1753–1806), English poet and writer
 Ian Yearsley (born 1965), English historian of Essex and author
 James Yearsley (1805–1869), English aural surgeon and publisher
 Ralph Yearsley (1896–1928), British-born character actor

See also
 Yearsley, a village in North Yorkshire, England